Cui Kai (born 21 January 1987 in Dalian) is a Chinese footballer who currently plays for China League Two side Guangxi Pingguo Haliao.

Club career
Cui Kai started his professional football career in 2005 when he was promoted to Liaoning Whowin's first squad.  On 22 September 2007, he made his debut for Liaoning FC in the 2007 Chinese Super League against Shanghai Shenhua. 
On 23 February 2013, Cui transferred to China League One side Chongqing F.C. on a free transfer.  He transferred to Shenyang Dongjin in 2014.
On 7 March 2016, Cui signed for China League One side Dalian Transcendence. 

On 28 February 2019, Cui transferred to China League Two side Dalian Chanjoy.

Career statistics
Statistics accurate as of match played 31 December 2020.

Honours

Club
Liaoning Whowin
China League One: 2009

References

External links
 

1987 births
Living people
Chinese footballers
Association football goalkeepers
Footballers from Dalian
Liaoning F.C. players
Shenyang Dongjin players
Dalian Transcendence F.C. players
Chinese Super League players
China League One players
Guangxi Pingguo Haliao F.C. players